Charles Frederick Swann (6 August 1883 – 7 March 1960) was an English cricketer.  Swann was a right-handed batsman who bowled right-arm medium-pace.  He was born at Leyton, Essex.

Swann made a single first-class appearance for Essex in 1912 against Yorkshire at the Fartown Ground, Huddersfield.  In his only first-class innings, Swann was dismissed for a duck by Alonzo Drake.

He died at Leytonstone, Essex on 7 March 1960.

References

External links
Charles Swann at ESPNcricinfo
Charles Swann at CricketArchive

1883 births
1960 deaths
People from Leyton
English cricketers
Essex cricketers